Commotion on the Ocean is a 1956 short subject directed by Jules White starring American slapstick comedy team the Three Stooges (Moe Howard, Larry Fine and Shemp Howard in his final starring role). It is the 174th entry in the series released by Columbia Pictures starring the comedians, who released 190 shorts for the studio between 1934 and 1959.

Plot
The Stooges play janitors who work at a newspaper office, begging to be given a chance to become reporters. The managing editor (Charles C. Wilson) promises to think about it over dinner. The phone rings while he is out and Moe answers. The person on the other end is one of the boss's reporters, Smitty (Emil Sitka), who relays a scoop to Moe that some important documents have been stolen by foreign spies. Coincidentally, the spy with the microfilmed documents, Mr. Borscht (Gene Roth) lives next door to the Stooges. He and the boys wind up as stowaways on an ocean liner. Stranded on a freighter on the high seas, and sustained by eating salami, the boys eventually overtake Borscht, recover the microfilm, and are thrilled with their newspaper scoop.

Cast
 Moe Howard as Moe
 Larry Fine as Larry
 Shemp Howard as Shemp (stock footage) (final film role)
 Joe Palma as Shemp (new footage) (obstruting his face) (uncredited)
 Gene Roth as Borscht
 Emil Sitka as Smitty
 Harriette Tarler as Emma Blake
 Charles C. Wilson as J. L. Cameron (stock footage)

Production notes
Commotion on the Ocean is a remake of 1949's Dunked in the Deep, using ample stock footage. In addition, the newspaper room scenes were borrowed from 1948's Crime on Their Hands. Commotion on the Ocean was the last of four shorts filmed in the wake of Shemp Howard's death using earlier footage and a stand-in. It marked the final film to feature Shemp as a stooge. He would be replaced by Joe Besser.

The film's plot device of hiding microfilm in watermelons is an allusion to an actual event that occurred in 1948. Time magazine's managing editor Whittaker Chambers, a former Communist spy-turned government informer, accused Alger Hiss of being a member of the Communist Party and a spy for the Soviet Union. In presenting evidence against Hiss, Chambers produced the Pumpkin Papers: five rolls of microfilm of State Department documents, which Chambers had concealed in a hollowed-out pumpkin on his Maryland farm.

"Fake Shemp"

As Shemp Howard had already died, for his last four films (Rumpus in the Harem, Hot Stuff, Scheming Schemers and Commotion on the Ocean), Columbia utilized supporting actor Joe Palma to be Shemp's double. Even though the last four shorts were remakes of earlier Shemp efforts, Palma's services were needed to link what few new scenes were filmed to the older stock footage.

For Commotion on the Ocean, Palma appears in one new shot during the newspaper office scene. After Larry says, "Oh, I know Smitty: 'Under the spreading chestnut tree, the village smitty stands, Moe slaps him. Palma gets involved in the slapstick exchange and shields himself in defense, obstructing his face.

All other new footage consists of Moe and Larry working as a duo, often discussing Shemp's absence aloud:
Moe: "I wonder what became of that Shemp?"
Larry: "You know he went up on deck to scout for some food.

"
This leads into the short's only new sequence. Moe and Larry attempt to steal a female passenger's fish dinner; but end up attempting to eat a taxidermy fish; with disastrous results.

This new footage was shot on January 17, 1956, six weeks after Shemp's death and one day after the previous film, Scheming Schemers.

Quotes
Larry: "You can take my word for it; when it comes to fish, I'm a common-sewer!"

See also
List of American films of 1956

References

External links 
 
 
Commotion on the Ocean at threestooges.net
What is a Fake Shemp?

1956 films
Columbia Pictures short films
1950s spy comedy films
1950s comedy mystery films
The Three Stooges films
American black-and-white films
The Three Stooges film remakes
American slapstick comedy films
American comedy thriller films
American spy comedy films
American comedy mystery films
Films directed by Jules White
Remakes of American films
1956 comedy films
1950s English-language films
1950s American films